James Edward Beauchamp (/ˈbiː-tʃʌm/ (BE-chum), August 21, 1939 – December 25, 2007) was a Major League Baseball first baseman and outfielder who played from  to  for the St. Louis Cardinals, Houston Colt .45s/Astros, Milwaukee/Atlanta Braves, Cincinnati Reds, and New York Mets. He was the father of former minor league baseball player Kash Beauchamp. He was 6'2' and weighed 205 pounds.

Professional career
He also collected 35 doubles and 10 triples while scoring 95 runs. Beauchamp won the 1963 Texas League MVP Award, and a sign showing him in his batting stance stood outside Tulsa's Oiler Park until the stadium was demolished in 1980. He earned a short call up to the majors in 1963, making his major league debut on September 22 at the age of 24, going hitless in three major league at-bats.

Beauchamp was traded to the Houston Colt .45s in February  with Chuck Taylor for outfielder Carl Warwick. Beauchamp again dominated in the minors in 1964, belting 34 home runs and collecting 83 RBI with a .285 batting average. In 23 Major League games that year, he collected nine hits in 55 at-bats for a .164 batting average.

He started the  season with the Houston Astros, playing in 24 games before being traded to the Milwaukee Braves with Ken Johnson for Lee Maye. He played in four games with the Braves that year. Overall, he hit .179 in 56 at-bats.

He did not appear in the Majors that season. He spent most of the  season in the minors as well, hitting 25 home runs and driving in 63 runs for Richmond. His averaged dropped to .233. He appeared in four games in the Majors for the Braves that year, collecting no hits in three at-bats.

In October 1967, Beauchamp was traded with Mack Jones and Jay Ritchie to the Reds for Deron Johnson.

He started the  season in the minors, hitting 13 home runs and driving in 47 RBI for the Indianapolis Indians. He spent 31 games in the Majors that year, hitting .263 in 57 at-bats.

After the season, he was traded back to Houston for Pat House and Dooley Womack. He hit .192 in 31 games for the Astros that year, and was traded to the Cardinals – another one of his former teams. He was sent with Leon McFadden to the Cardinals for George Culver. He hit .259 in 44 games for the Cardinals, and overall he hit .238 on the season.

He was traded with Harry Parker, Chuck Taylor and Chip Coulter from the Cardinals to the Mets for Art Shamsky, Jim Bibby, Rich Folkers, and Charlie Hudson on October 18, 1971.

He played his final regular season game on September 20, 1973, almost exactly 10 years after his big league debut. Beauchamp appeared in four games in the 1973 World Series for the Mets, going hitless in four at-bats.

Overall, Beauchamp played in 393 Major League games, collecting 153 hits in 661 at-bats for a .231 batting average. He hit 18 doubles, four triples and 14 home runs while driving in 90 RBI. He walked 54 times and struck out 150 times. Defensively, he recorded an overall .979 fielding percentage.

Coaching

After baseball
In 2002, Beauchamp was present with family and friends when he was honored in his hometown of Grove, Oklahoma by naming the new Grove City Baseball Field after him nearly five decades after his high school graduation. "Jim Beauchamp Field" is home to the Qualate-Pritchard American Legion Baseball team, and the Ridgerunner Baseball team of Grove High School, where Beauchamp was an Oklahoma All-State Athlete. Beauchamp's boyhood home was across the street where the new ballpark now stands. After the presentation, an emotional Beauchamp expressed to those present that it was the highest honor he had ever received. Coincidentally, "beau champ" in French translates as "beautiful field."

On Christmas Day, 2007, Beauchamp died following a long battle with cronic myelogenous leukemia at the age of 68. 

In his honor, the Atlanta Braves wore a memorial patch emblazoned with his nickname, "Beach", during the 2008 season. 

He was survived by his wife Pam; five children Kash, Tim, Ann Rene, Shanna and Lauren; six grandchildren; sister Patti Crockett; sister-in-law Kay Beauchamp; and stepmother Lee Jean Beachamp.

References

External links

1939 births
2007 deaths
Baseball players from Oklahoma
Major League Baseball outfielders
Major League Baseball first basemen
St. Louis Cardinals players
Houston Colt .45s players
Houston Astros players
Houston Astros scouts
Milwaukee Braves players
Atlanta Braves players
Atlanta Braves coaches
Cincinnati Reds players
New York Mets players
Indianapolis Indians players
Richmond Braves players
Major League Baseball bench coaches
Deaths from chronic myeloid leukemia
Deaths from cancer in Georgia (U.S. state)
Indianapolis Indians managers
Syracuse Chiefs managers
People from Vinita, Oklahoma
People from Grove, Oklahoma
Baseball coaches from Oklahoma